KB Prizreni, formerly KB Kalaja, also known as KB Ponte Prizreni due to sponsorship reason, is a professional basketball club based in Prizren, Kosovo. The club currently plays in the Kosovo Basketball Superleague. 

The 2018–19 season was the club's first season in the Kosovo Superleague after year they got promoted. In 2021, the team won its first trophy when it won the Kosovo Basketball Supercup.

Home arena 
The club currently plays in the sport center Sezai Surroi, in the center of Prizren, with a capacity for around 3,200 spectators.

Honours
Kosovo Basketball Supercup
Winners (1): 2021

Players

Current roster

|}
| style="vertical-align:top;" |
Head coach
 Edin Kerveshi

Assistant coach

Legend
(C) Team captain
|}<noinclude>

Depth chart

Notable players

 Xavier Cannefax

References

External links
 Eurobasket.com team profile

Kosovo Basketball Superleague
Sport in Prizren
Basketball teams established in 2015